The discography of American indie rock band the National consists of eight studio albums, two extended plays (EPs), thirteen singles and nine music videos. The band's first two albums, were released by Brassland Records. Their next two albums were released by Beggars Banquet Records, and their fifth, sixth and seventh albums were released by 4AD.

The documentary film, A Skin, a Night, accompanied the band's 2008 EP, The Virginia. The National's fifth studio album, High Violet (2010), reached the top ten of a dozen national charts, including peaks of number three in the United States and number five in the United Kingdom. It was certified gold in the UK, Denmark, Ireland and Belgium. The album's lead single, "Bloodbuzz Ohio", peaked at number 16 on the Belgian Ultratop chart.

Albums

Studio albums

Live albums

Extended plays

Singles

As lead artist

As featured artist

Other charted or certified songs

Other appearances

Music videos

Notes

References

External links
 Official website
 The National at AllMusic
 
 

Discographies of American artists
Rock music group discographies